Syntel, Inc., was a multinational provider of integrated technology and business services. The company was led by Rakesh Khanna. Atos Syntel was created by the acquisition of Syntel, Inc. by Atos S.E., which was announced on July 22, 2018, and completed on October 9, 2018. The subsidiary was later dissolved into Atos itself.

Business

Syntel, Inc. operates its business through four segments: Application Outsourcing, Knowledge Process Outsourcing, e-Business and TeamSourcing. The Application Outsourcing segment provides outsourcing services for ongoing management, development and maintenance of customer's business applications. The Knowledge Process Outsourcing segment provides outsourced solutions for a customer's business processes, providing them with the process enhancement through optimal use of technology. The e-Business segment provides development and implementation services for a number of emerging and rapidly growing technology applications, including web development, data warehousing, e-commerce, CRM, Oracle and SAP, as well as partnership agreements with software providers. The TeamSourcing segment provides professional information technology consulting services directly to customers on a staff augmentation basis and its services include systems specification, design, development, implementation and maintenance of complex information technology applications involving diverse computer hardware, software, data and networking technologies and practices.

References

Companies formerly listed on the Nasdaq
Software companies based in Michigan
Companies based in Troy, Michigan
Software companies established in 1980
1980 establishments in Michigan
International information technology consulting firms
1997 initial public offerings
2018 mergers and acquisitions
American subsidiaries of foreign companies
Defunct software companies of the United States